Atraulia is a constituency of the Uttar Pradesh Legislative Assembly covering the town of Atrauliya in the Azamgarh district of Uttar Pradesh, India.

Atraulia is one of five assembly constituencies in the Lalganj Lok Sabha constituency. Since 2008, this assembly constituency is numbered 343 amongst 403 constituencies.

Election results

2022

2017
Samajwadi Party candidate Sangram Yadav won in last Assembly election of 2017 Uttar Pradesh Legislative Elections defeating Bharatiya Janta Party candidate Kanhaiya Lal Nishad by a margin of 2,467 votes.

Members of Legislative Assembly

References

External links
 

Assembly constituencies of Uttar Pradesh
Politics of Azamgarh district